Liverpool Fairfield was a borough constituency in Liverpool which returned one Member of Parliament (MP)  to the House of Commons of the Parliament of the United Kingdom from 1918, until it was abolished for the 1950 general election.

Boundaries
The County Borough of Liverpool wards of Fairfield and Old Swan, and part of Kensington ward.

Members of Parliament

Elections

Elections in the 1910s

Elections in the 1920s

Elections in the 1930s 

General Election 1939–40
Another General Election was required to take place before the end of 1940. The political parties had been making preparations for an election to take place and by the Autumn of 1939, the following candidates had been selected; 
Conservative: Edmund Brocklebank
Labour: Arthur Moody

Elections in the 1940s

References

 

Parliamentary constituencies in North West England (historic)
Fairfield
Constituencies of the Parliament of the United Kingdom established in 1918
Constituencies of the Parliament of the United Kingdom disestablished in 1950